Rishihat Tea Garden (also spelled Risheehat) is  a village in the Darjeeling Pulbazar CD block in the Darjeeling Sadar subdivision of the Darjeeling district in the state of West Bengal, India.

History
The place was known as Tsering Bagan in its early history because of the predominance of Tserings (a Tibetan group) in the area. British planters established a tea garden in the place in the 1900s. It was later renamed Rishihat meaning ‘home of holy sages’. In 1955, it was acquired by Jay Shree Tea.

Prior to 1963, Liza Hill Tea Estate was a separate estate with its own tea factory, but later it became a division of Rishihat Tea Garden.

Geography

Location                                            
It has a rich and fertile soil.

Tea gardens around Rishihat include: Arya Tea Estate and Chongtong Tea Garden. It is about 14 km from Darjeeling.

Area overview
The map alongside shows the northern portion of the Darjeeling Himalayan hill region. In Darjeeling Sadar subdivision 61% of the total population lives in the rural areas and 39% of the population lives in the urban areas. There are 78 tea gardens/ estates (the figure varies slightly according to different sources), producing and largely exporting Darjeeling tea in the district. It engages a large proportion of the population directly/ indirectly. Some tea gardens were identified in the 2011 census as census towns or villages. Such places are marked in the map as CT (census town) or R (rural/ urban centre). Specific tea estate pages are marked TE.

Note: The map alongside presents some of the notable locations in the subdivision. All places marked in the map are linked in the larger full screen map.

Demographics
According to the 2011 Census of India, Rishihat Tea Garden had a total population of 1,651 of which 815 (49%) were males and 836 (51%) were females. There were 111 persons in the age range of 0 to 6 years. The total number of literate people in Rishihat Tea Garden was 1,147 (69.47% of the population over 6 years).

Economy
Rishihat Tea Garden annually produces over 180 tonnes of certified bio-organic teas. Rishihat Tea Garden has Fair Trade certification, ISO 1901:2008 awarded by TUV NORD and also HAACCP, and organic certificates for NPOP, POP and JAS by IMO.

It is famous for its second flush muscatel flavour. The types of tea the garden produces include: Black tea, Green tea, Oolong tea, hand rolled tea, Wirry tea, Silver Tippy tea, exclusive Darjeeling teas like Enigma, Exotic, Clonal Mush and Clonal Enigma.

The other tea gardens of the Jay Shree Tea & Industries  Ltd., owned by the B.K.Birla group, in Darjeeling are: Puttabong (Tukvar) Tea Estate, Sungma Tea Garden, North Tukvar Tea Estate, Singbulli Tea Garden and Balasun Tea Estate.

Culture
It has a newly constructed temple of Lord Krishna and Radha.

References

External links
 

Villages in Darjeeling district